Brad Oborne (born 19 June 1980) is a former Australian rules footballer who played with Collingwood in the Australian Football League (AFL).

The 35th selection from the 1998 AFL draft, Oborne was secured by Collingwood under the father–son rule, as his father Rod Oborne had played for the club in the 1970s. He was drafted from TAC Cup side the Preston Knights, having earlier played with Montmorency.

He played four games for Collingwood in the 1999 AFL season and had his best performance against the Brisbane Lions at the Gabba when he kicked three goals. The following year he was called up to the seniors just once and at the end of the season was delisted by Collingwood.

References

External links
 
 

1980 births
Australian rules footballers from Victoria (Australia)
Collingwood Football Club players
Northern Knights players
Montmorency Football Club players
Living people